Nina Burger (born 27 December 1987) is an Austrian former football striker, who played for SC Sand of Frauen Bundesliga, after playing for SV Neulengbach of Austria's ÖFB-Frauenliga. She also played the 2014 season for the Houston Dash in the National Women's Soccer League (NWSL). She was the ÖFB-Frauenliga's top scorer for six seasons in a row between 2007 and 2012.

On 1 April 2019, she announced retirement from the Austrian national team, after playing 108 matches with 53 goals.

Honours

SV Neulengbach
 ÖFB-Frauenliga: Winner 2005–06, 2006–07, 2007–08, 2008–09, 2009–10, 2010–11, 2011–12, 2012–13, 2013–14, 2014–15
 ÖFB Ladies Cup: Winner 2005–06, 2006–07, 2007–08, 2008–09, 2009–10, 2010–11, 2011–12

SC Sand
 DFB-Pokal: Runner-up 2015–16, 2016–17

National Team

 Cyprus Cup: Winner 2016

Individual
 Top scorer ÖFB-Frauenliga: 2006–2007, 2007–2008, 2008–2009, 2009–2010, 2010–2011, 2011–2012

References

External links
 
 Profile in UEFA.com

1987 births
Living people
Austrian women's footballers
Houston Dash players
National Women's Soccer League players
Austria women's international footballers
SV Neulengbach (women) players
Austrian expatriate sportspeople in the United States
Expatriate women's soccer players in the United States
Austrian expatriate women's footballers
People from Tulln an der Donau
Women's association football forwards
SC Sand players
FIFA Century Club
Austrian expatriate sportspeople in Germany
ÖFB-Frauenliga players
Frauen-Bundesliga players
UEFA Women's Euro 2017 players
Footballers from Lower Austria